Xie Longfei (born 15 July 2000) is a Chinese footballer currently playing as a forward for Qingdao Youth Island, on loan from Beijing Guoan.

Club career
Xie was invited to join the academy of Villarreal in 2013, as part of the Wanda Group initiative to bring young Chinese players to Spanish clubs. After three years, he returned to China in 2017, signing with Beijing Guoan.

In August 2022, he was sent on loan to Qingdao Youth Island on loan.

Career statistics

Club
.

References

2000 births
Living people
Chinese footballers
Association football forwards
Chinese Super League players
China League One players
Villarreal CF players
Beijing Guoan F.C. players
Chinese expatriate footballers
Chinese expatriate sportspeople in Spain
Expatriate footballers in Spain